Wilmar Jahir Pérez Muñoz (born 8 November 1986) is a Colombian road cyclist, who currently rides for EBSA–Indeportes Boyacá.

Major results

2010
 1st Stage 3 Vuelta al Tolima
 3rd Overall Clásica de Girardot
1st Stage 3
 6th Overall Vuelta a Bolivia
2012
 1st Stage 6 Clásico RCN
2013
 1st Overall Vuelta a Boyacá
1st Stage 1
 1st Stage 7 Clásico RCN
 9th Overall Vuelta a Colombia
2015
 2nd Overall Vuelta a Guatemala
1st Stage 7
2017
 Jelajah Malaysia
1st Mountains classification
1st Stage 4
 5th Overall Tour de Singkarak
 7th Overall Tour de Lombok
1st Stage 3
 7th Overall Tour de Selangor
2018
 3rd Overall Tour de Lombok
2019
 7th Overall Vuelta Independencia Nacional
 10th Overall Vuelta a Guatemala
2022
 2nd Overall Vuelta a Guatemala
1st Stage 3
 5th Overall Vuelta al Táchira

References

External links

1986 births
Living people
Colombian male cyclists
Sportspeople from Boyacá Department
21st-century Colombian people